Holes is a 1998 young adult novel written by Louis Sachar and first published by Farrar, Straus and Giroux. The book centers on Stanley Yelnats, who is sent to Camp Green Lake, a correctional boot camp in a desert in Texas, after being falsely accused of theft. The plot explores the history of the area and how the actions of several characters in the past have affected Stanley's life in the present. These interconnecting stories touch on themes such as racism, homelessness, illiteracy, and arranged marriage.

The book was both a critical and commercial success. Much of the praise for the book has centered around its complex plot, interesting characters, and representation of people of color and incarcerated youth. It won the 1998 US National Book Award for Young People's Literature and the 1999 Newbery Medal for the year's "most distinguished contribution to American literature for children". In 2012 it was ranked number six among all-time children's novels in a survey published by School Library Journal.

Holes was adapted by Walt Disney Pictures as a feature film of the same name released in 2003. The film received generally positive reviews from critics, grossing $71 million, and was released in conjunction with the book companion Stanley Yelnats' Survival Guide to Camp Green Lake. A spin-off sequel to Holes entitled Small Steps was published in 2006 and centers on one of the secondary characters in the novel, Theodore "Armpit" Johnson.

Plot
Stanley Yelnats IV is wrongfully convicted of theft and as a consequence is sent to Camp Green Lake, a juvenile corrections facility. The novel presents Stanley's story together with two other linked stories.

Elya Yelnats 
Elya Yelnats is 14 years old and lives in Latvia. He is in love with Myra Menke, the most beautiful girl in the village. Myra's father has decided that she should marry when she turns fifteen in two months. Fifty-seven year-old Igor Barkov offers his fattest pig to Myra's father in exchange for her hand. Elya asks his friend Madame Zeroni, an old Egyptian fortune teller with a missing foot, for help. Madame Zeroni advises Elya to go to America like her son, but when she sees his sorrow, she pities Elya and gives him a runt piglet. She tells him to carry it to the top of the mountain every day and sing a special song while it drinks from a stream that runs uphill. If he does this, his pig will be fatter than any of Igor's. Madame Zeroni says that in return, Elya must then carry her up the mountain and sing to her while she drinks from the stream. She warns him that if he does not, his family will be cursed.

Elya follows Madame Zeroni's directions until the last day, when he takes a bath instead of carrying the pig up the hill. His pig and Igor's weigh exactly the same, so Myra's father lets her decide who to marry. When Myra is unable to choose, Elya realizes Madame Zeroni was right about Myra. He tells her to keep his pig and, forgetting his promise to Madame Zeroni, leaves for America. He marries the kind and intelligent Sarah Miller but is continually beset by bad luck. The song that he sang to the pig becomes a lullaby passed down by his family.

Kissin' Kate Barlow 
In the year 1888, Green Lake is a flourishing Texas lakeside village. Katherine Barlow, a European-American local schoolteacher famous for her spiced peaches, falls in love with Sam, an African-American onion farmer. She rejects the advances of Charles Walker, the richest man in town, who is nicknamed Trout because his feet smell like dead fish. After Katherine and Sam are seen kissing, Walker raises a mob to burn down the schoolhouse. Katherine goes to the sheriff for help; but refuses to help her and instead demands a kiss. Katherine and Sam attempt to escape across the lake in Sam's rowboat, but Walker intercepts them with his motorboat. Sam is shot dead and his boat wrecked, while Katherine is "rescued" against her wishes. From that day on, no rain falls upon Green Lake.

Three days later, Katherine shoots and kills the sheriff. She becomes the outlaw "Kissin' Kate Barlow", so named because she leaves a red lipstick kiss on the cheeks of the men she kills. She robs Stanley Yelnats, son of Elya Yelnats, and leaves him stranded in the desert. Seventeen days later, he is rescued by hunters, but he is delirious and can only explain his survival by saying he "found refuge on God's thumb." After twenty years, Katherine retires to the ruins of Green Lake, now a hot and lifeless wasteland. She is found by Trout Walker and his wife Linda Miller, one of Katherine's former fourth-grade students. They are destitute, since Walker's fortune dried up with the lake. They demand that Katherine dig up her hidden loot. She refuses, telling them that they and their children and grandchildren could dig holes for the next hundred years without finding it. They try to force Katherine to lead them to the loot; rather than give up the location, Katherine instead lets herself be bitten by a highly venomous yellow-spotted lizard nearby, and dies laughing at the two, the venom taking its effect on her.

Camp Green Lake 
Stanley Yelnats IV's family is cursed. The family jokingly blames Stanley's "no-good-dirty-rotten-pig-stealing-great-great-grandfather", Elya Yelnats, for their constant misfortunes. Stanley, who is in middle school, is convicted of stealing a pair of athletic shoes that baseball player Clyde "Sweet Feet" Livingston had donated to a charity auction for the homeless. Stanley is sent to Camp Green Lake, a juvenile corrections facility.

Prisoners at Camp Green Lake are required to "build character" by digging one cylindrical hole five feet wide and five feet deep every day. The Warden allows campers a day off if they find anything "interesting." The leader of Stanley's group, a boy nicknamed X-Ray, tells Stanley to give him anything interesting he finds. Late one day, Stanley finds an empty lipstick tube with "KB" engraved. He gives it to X-Ray, who pretends to find it the next morning. For the next week and a half, the Warden has the boys excavate the area of X-Ray's supposed discovery. Stanley concludes that she is searching for something.

Stanley learns that another prisoner, Zero, is illiterate. Zero volunteers to dig part of Stanley's hole each day if Stanley teaches him to read. When one of the counselors, Mr. Pendanski, says that Zero is too stupid to learn to read, Zero smashes Mr. Pendanski's face with his shovel and flees into the desert. When Zero does not return, the Warden assumes he has died. To avoid an investigation, she orders Mr. Pendanski to destroy Zero's records.

Stanley goes into the desert to save Zero. He finds Zero hiding under the wreck of a rowboat. Zero has survived on what he calls "sploosh," a peachy nectar stored in old jars he found under the rowboat. Stanley and Zero drink the last of the sploosh. Zero refuses to return to camp, so they head for a nearby mountain, Big Thumb, that looks like a thumbs up sign. As they ascend the mountain, Zero collapses. Stanley carries Zero up the hill. He finds water, gives it to Zero, and sings his family lullaby.

Stanley and Zero live on Big Thumb for a week, eating wild onions from Sam's old onion fields. Zero, whose real name is Hector Zeroni, reveals that he stole Clyde Livingston's shoes. He was homeless and needed new shoes. When he realized everyone was making a commotion about the missing shoes, he discarded them by putting them on the roof of a moving car, and they accidentally landed on Stanley.

The boys secretly return to Camp Green Lake, and overnight, they dig where Stanley found the lipstick tube. They find a suitcase but are caught by the Warden. The Warden and the counselors stand watch over the boys all night, but they do not approach because the boys are in a nest of highly venomous yellow-spotted lizards. Stanley and Zero, however, are safe from the lizards because they smell like onions (which the lizards are known to avoid). When the sun rises, Stanley's lawyer Ms. Morengo and the state Attorney General arrive; Stanley's conviction has been overturned. The Warden claims that the suitcase was stolen from her, but the suitcase has "Stanley Yelnats" written on it. Stanley refuses to leave without Hector, so Ms. Morengo asks to see Hector's file. When Hector's records can't be found, Ms. Morengo demands that he be released, too. As they drive away, rain falls on Camp Green Lake.

The Attorney General closes Camp Green Lake. The Warden, whose real name is Ms. Walker, is forced to sell the land.

Hector is revealed to be Madame Zeroni's great-great-great-grandson. The day after Stanley carried Hector up the mountain, Stanley's father invented a product that eliminated foot odor. It smells like peaches, and the boys name it "Sploosh." The suitcase, which had belonged to Stanley's great-grandfather, contains financial instruments worth nearly two million dollars. Stanley and Hector split the money, and Hector hires private investigators to find his mother. A year and a half later, the Yelnats house hosts a Super Bowl party celebrating Clyde Livingston's endorsement of Sploosh. Hector's mother softly sings to him a second verse to the Yelnats' family lullaby.

Characters

Camp Green Lake
Stanley Yelnats IV (also known as "Caveman" by the rest of the campers, but referred to in the book by his proper name): Stanley is a 14-year-old boy who does not have any friends from school and is often picked on by his classmates and the school bully. Stanley's family is cursed with bad luck, and although they do not have much money, they always try to remain hopeful and look on the bright side of things. Stanley shares these traits with his family and, although he does not have a lot of self-confidence, he is not easily depressed, a characteristic that helps him adjust to the horrendous conditions of Camp Green Lake. However, he has a bad habit of blaming his great-great-grandfather when he gets in trouble. This habit made him impudent. As the book progresses, Stanley slowly gains strength. He identifies the people who threaten him, like the Warden. While he tries not to get in trouble, he also stands up for himself and his friends and family. Stanley rebels for the rights of his friends when he steals Mr. Sir's truck to look for Zero in the dry lake bed.
Zero (Hector Zeroni): Zero is known to be the best digger and the youngest inmate at Camp Green Lake. So often, he is considered to be "stupid" or a mere nothing by the other boys and the counselors alike. He lacks an education, meaning he's unable to read or write. Despite this, he is intelligent and manages to stand for himself in the face of adversity, breaking Mr. Pendanski's nose with a shovel after one too many snide remarks. Typically he is noted as the character that hardly speaks due to the fact that he is wary of those who mock him. He is said to always have a scowl on his face and does not like to answer questions. Zero is shown to be an honest character after becoming close friends with Stanley. Zero is the one who stole the shoes that Stanley was arrested for and accused of stealing. He is the descendant of Madame Zeroni, the woman who put a curse on Stanley's family. He has been homeless for most of his life, as well as being abandoned by his mother at a very young age. Although he suffers quite a bit, he always seems to persevere and come out on top.
X-Ray (Rex Washburn): X-Ray is the unofficial head of the boys in Group D. X-Ray decides that Stanley will be called Caveman and fixes the order of the line for water. X-Ray maintains his position as the leader of the boys even though he is one of the smallest and can barely see without his glasses. He convinces Stanley to give him the lipstick tube that Stanley finds in his hole so that he can have the day off instead of Stanley. X-Ray is able to maintain his position at the head of the group through a system of rewards and allies. Every time that Stanley does something nice for X-Ray, X-Ray is nice to Stanley and stands up for him when the other boys pick on him. When Stanley becomes friends with Zero, however, X-Ray's system is threatened and he becomes hostile toward Stanley. His nickname X-ray comes from it being pig Latin of his actual name, Rex.
Squid (Alan): Squid is a member of Group D at Camp Green Lake. He is often the one taunting Stanley for sending and receiving letters to his mother. Just like X-Ray, Squid is very tough but very subservient to X-Ray's rules and directions. However, he does have a sensitive side to him, as Stanley wakes to hear him crying one night, and Alan asks Stanley to write to his (Alan's) mother when Stanley leaves Camp Green Lake.
Magnet (José): Another member of Group D. Magnet earned his nickname because of his ability to steal, he got into Camp Green Lake for stealing animals from the zoo and refers to his fingers as "little magnets".
Armpit (Theodore Thomas Johnson): One of X-Ray's close friends at camp, he pushes Stanley when Stanley calls him Theodore. His nickname Armpit is due to him being stung by a scorpion at camp and the venom traveling up into his armpit, causing him to complain about his armpit hurting.
ZigZag (Ricky): Zigzag is described as being the tallest kid of Group D, constantly looking like he has been electrocuted, with frizzy hair. Stanley often thinks he is the strangest camper at Camp Green Lake. Zigzag is the one who hit Stanley on the head with a shovel, but later did apologize. Zigzag suffers from paranoia, highlighting his displayed "craziness".
 Twitch (Brian): A car thief who arrives at camp after Stanley. He got his nickname for his constant twitching.
The Warden (Louise Walker): Running Camp Green Lake, she is known to be violent, abusive, and quite rude. She uses her power and privilege to get what she wants and make members of the camp do as she pleases. She has hidden cameras, using them to spy on the members of the camp. She is often thought to have hidden cameras in the showers, causing Stanley to be paranoid whenever he takes a shower, rushing out as fast as possible. She wears nail polish traced with rattlesnake venom, and scratches those who displease or go against what she says. She has the members of Camp Green Lake digging holes to look for Kate Barlow's hidden treasure. She is the granddaughter of Charles "Trout" Walker. Her family had been digging the treasure out since her birth, but to no success.
Mr. Sir (Marion Sevillo): One of the counselors at Camp Green Lake, he is constantly eating sunflower seeds. He took up this habit after deciding to quit smoking. He is known to be rude and tough.
Mr. Pendanski: In Group D at Camp Green Lake Mr. Pendanski is in charge. Mr. Pendanski may seem friendly at first glance, but he is just as mean as the Warden and Mr. Sir. He is known to frequently single out Zero. When Zero returns to the camp, he attacks Mr. Pendanski with a shovel.

Town of Green Lake
 Katherine Barlow (Kissin' Kate Barlow): Katherine Barlow is a sweet and intelligent woman who teaches in a one-room school house on Green Lake one hundred and ten years before Stanley arrives at Camp Green Lake. She falls in love with Sam, a man who sells onions in the town. Although the rest of the white people in the town are racist and enforce rules that prohibit black people from going to school, Kate, who is white, does not care about the color of a person's skin and she loves Sam for the person that he is. When Kate and Sam kiss, the angry townsfolk kill Sam and destroy her beloved schoolhouse. Kate is devastated by Sam's death and becomes Kissin' Kate Barlow, one of the most feared outlaws in the West. She always leaves her mark by kissing someone when she finishes killing them; if she had only robbed them, she would leave them in the hot desert. She is the outlaw responsible for robbing Stanley Yelnats I (Stanley's ancestor). Kate dies when she gets bitten by a yellow-spotted lizard in the ankle, but dies laughing because the Walker family will never find her treasure. The lipstick tube that Stanley finds during his second week at Camp Green Lake was owned by Kate Barlow.
Sam: Sam is an African-American farmer in the town Green Lake, Texas who grows onions. He believes onions are the cure to everything and makes many remedies from onions. He also has an immense love for his donkey, Mary Lou. His relationship with Kate begins when he exchanges his onions for some jars of peaches. He is murdered in cold blood by Charles "Trout" Walker. His death is implied to have set a curse upon the lake, causing the rain to stop coming and the lake to dry up.
Charles "Trout" Walker: Charles "Trout" Walker is an extremely spoiled son of a rich family in Green Lake. He gets upset when Kate denies his request to date her. This adds on to the reason of causing him to lead the townspeople to burn down the schoolhouse and kill Sam. His nickname Trout comes from his foot fungus that causes his feet to smell like dead fish. After Kate leaves to become an outlaw, he marries Linda Miller but his family loses everything after the lake dries up. He is The Warden's grandfather, who upon his death, opens up the juvenile detention camp to increase the efficiency of finding Kate Barlow's hidden treasure.
Stanley Yelnats I: Stanley Yelnats I is the son of Elya Yelnats as well as the great-grandfather of Stanley Yelnats IV. He was the one whose treasure was stolen by Kate Barlow while he was moving from New York to California. He is known to have survived by climbing to the top of a thumb-shaped mountain (God's Thumb) which happens to be Sam's old onion field.

Mid-1800s Latvia
Elya Yelnats: Elya is the great-great-grandfather of Stanley. He is often referred to as his "No-good-dirty-rotten-pig-stealing-great-great-grandfather", constantly being blamed for everything that goes wrong in Stanley's life.  He is considered to be the reason why the Yelnats family has such bad luck. After he fell in love with the woman in Latvia, he travels to America, forgetting to go through with the promise he made to an old woman named Madame Zeroni. This causes generations of bad luck to trickle down the Yelnats family tree. However, he does pass down an important song that Madame Zeroni taught him in Latvia.
Madame Zeroni: Madame Zeroni is the great-great-great-grandmother of Hector Zeroni (Zero). She is great friends with Elya Yelnats, and she gives him a pig. Because Elya breaks his promise of carrying her to the top of the mountain, she is considered to be the one who put a "curse" on the Yelnats family.
Myra Menke: Myra is the most beautiful girl in the Latvian village of Elya and Madame Zeroni. Madame Zeroni considers her inadequate. Myra's father promised to award her hand in marriage to whichever suitor can raise the fattest pig. When the pigs were the same size, Myra asked Elya and Igor Barkov to guess a number between 1 and 10, showing her inability to make her own decisions.
Igor Barkov: Igor was Elya's competitor for the hand of Myra Menke. He was already old and fat, but was a successful pig farmer.

Minor characters
Mr. Yelnats (Stanley Yelnats III): Mr. Yelnats is Stanley's father. He is an inventor and quite smart, but extremely unlucky. He attempts to discover a way to recycle old sneakers and because of this, the Yelnats' apartment smells bad. However, he eventually discovers a cure to ridding foot odor and is able to hire a lawyer, Ms. Morengo, to get Stanley out of Camp Green Lake.
Mrs. Yelnats: Mrs. Yelnats is Stanley's mother. She does not believe in curses but always points out the terrible luck that the Yelnats have.
Barf Bag (Louis): A "camper" who left Camp Green Lake before Stanley arrived. He deliberately got a rattlesnake to bite him in order to be hospitalized.

Setting
Camp Green Lake is located on a dried-up lake in the US state of Texas. The name is a false description, as the area is a parched, barren desert. The only weather is the scorching sun. No rain has fallen since the day Sam was murdered. The only plants mentioned are two oak trees in front of the Warden's cabin; the book notes that "the Warden owns the shade." The abandoned town of Green Lake is located by the side of the lakebed. Camp Green Lake is a correctional boot camp, where "campers" spend most of their time digging holes. The majority of the book alternates between the present day story of Stanley Yelnats, the story of Elya Yelnats in Latvia (ca. mid-19th century) and the story of Katherine Barlow in the town of Green Lake in the 1880s. Later chapters focus less on the past stories and more on the present.

Themes

Fairy tales 
The themes typical of a folk or fairy tale are present throughout the novel, notable in both Stanley and Elya's narratives. Elya must go on an adventure to win his love's approval and prove his own worth and he is eventually placed under a witch's curse. Stanley's bad luck is blamed on the curse left on his great-great-grandfather and the Yelnats family easily believes in the power of this curse. Both Stanley and Elya are similar to fairy tale characters and are morally good, heroic protagonists who must overcome the challenges predestined for them. Both story lines are accompanied by a magic that is seen in the mountain stream, Madame Zeroni's song, and the healing power of the onions. Each of these elements in Holes mirror elements frequently found in fairy tales.

Names 
Throughout the novel, names act as a theme that allows the characters to disassociate their lives at Camp Green Lake from their lives back in the real world. Names also demonstrate irony—Camp Green Lake is not actually a camp, it's located in a desert, and there is no lake. The "campers" all label themselves differently and identify with names such as Armpit and X-Ray and the guards are referred to as counselors. One of the counselors, Mr. Pendanski, is referred to by the boys as "Mom", representing the absent parents at Camp Green Lake. Only the woman in charge is referred to in a prison-like way and is called "Warden". The different names allow the boys to bond and form a team based in their hatred for their work and the counselors. Many of the characters also have names that connect them to their family history, like the passing down of "Stanley Yelnats" and Zero's last name of Zeroni, and remind them how the actions of their ancestors affect their modern-day lives. Stanley is the fourth "Stanley Yelnats" in his family, a name that is passed down due to its palindromic nature and adds to the connection to family history.

Labor
Labor is seen throughout the novel as the children are forced to dig holes while at Camp Green Lake. This theme is unusual in children's literature as many authors portray children as carefree and without responsibility. If they do engage in work, it is synonymous with play. Critic Maria Nikolajeva contends that Holes is set apart through the not just manual, but forced labor Stanley and the other campers do daily. This is first referenced at the beginning of the book when the purpose of the camp is stated: "If you take a bad boy and make him dig a hole every day in the hot sun, it will turn him into a good boy".

Reception
Holes has received many accolades:

 John Newbery Medal
 1998, US National Book Award for Young People's Literature 
 1998, American Library Association, Best Books for Young Adults
 1999 Newbery Medal for the year's "most distinguished contribution to American literature for children" 
 1999, Boston Globe-Horn Book Award for Fiction 
 2000, Zilveren Zoen 
 2000, Flicker Tale Children's Book Award 
 2000, Pennsylvania Young Readers' Choice Award for Grades 6-8 
 2000, Dorothy Canfield Fisher Children's Book Award  
 2001, William Allen White Children's Book Award
 2001, West Australian Young Readers' Book Award (WAYRBA) for Older Readers
 2001, Grand Canyon Reader Award for Teen Book 
 2001, Nene Award
 2001, Maryland Black-Eyed Susan Book Award for Grade 6-9 
 2001, Massachusetts Children's Book Award 
 2001, Evergreen Teen Book Award 
 2003, Soaring Eagle Book Award 
 2002, Sunshine State Young Readers Award for Grades 3-5 and Grades 6-8 
 2001, Pacific Northwest Library Association Young Reader's Choice Award for Junior 
 2001, Deutscher Jugendliteraturpreis Nominee for Jugendbuch 
 2001, New Mexico Land of Enchantment Award for Young Adult
 2001, Oklahoma Sequoyah Award for Children and YA 
 2002, Rebecca Caudill Young Readers' Book Award 
 2000, Premi Protagonista Jove for Categoria 14-15 anys

Over two decades after its original publication, Holes continues to be well received by critics and was ranked number 6 among all-time children's novels by School Library Journal in 2012.

Betsy Hearne of The New York Times applauded the novel's integration of mystery and humor that manages to keep Holes light and fresh, and she characterizes it as a "family read-aloud." Roger Sutton of The Horn Book Magazine called Sachar's declarative style effective, and argues that it helped make the novel more poignant. Sutton appreciated the positive ending and the suspense that leads the reader to it.

Film adaptation

In 2003, Walt Disney Pictures released a film version of Holes, which was directed by Andrew Davis and written by Louis Sachar.

Sequels
Two companion novels have followed Holes: Stanley Yelnats' Survival Guide to Camp Green Lake (2003) and Small Steps (2006).

Stanley Yelnats's Survival Guide to Camp Green Lake
As Louis Sachar states: "Should you ever find yourself at Camp Green Lake—or somewhere similar—this is the guide for you." Written from Stanley's point of view, the book offers advice on everything from scorpions, rattlesnakes, yellow-spotted lizards, etc.

Small Steps
In this sequel to Holes, former camper Armpit is now 17 and struggling with the challenges facing an African American teenager with a criminal history. A new friendship with Ginny, who has cerebral palsy, a reunion with former friend X-Ray, a ticket-scalping scheme, a beautiful pop singer, and a frame-up all test Armpit's resolve to  "Just take small steps and keep moving forward".

References

External links

 Holes at publisher Scholastic Corporation

1998 American novels
Novels by Louis Sachar
American young adult novels
Newbery Medal–winning works
Mark Twain Awards
National Book Award for Young People's Literature winning works
Family saga novels
Novels set in Texas
Novels set in Latvia
American satirical novels
Farrar, Straus and Giroux books
American novels adapted into films
Works about child labour
American magic realism novels
Juvenile delinquency in fiction
Novels about racism
Western (genre) novels